John and Martinus Laraway Inn, also known as the O'Hara Home, is a historic home located at Prattsville, Greene County, New York. It was built about 1785 and altered about 1830, and is a two-story, five-bay, single pile, Greek Revival style frame dwelling. It features a two-story, full width front porch with fluted Doric order columns.  The building served as a hotel and social hall into the early-20th century.

It was added to the National Register of Historic Places in 2012.

References

Houses on the National Register of Historic Places in New York (state)
Greek Revival houses in New York (state)
Federal architecture in New York (state)
Houses completed in 1785
Houses in Greene County, New York
National Register of Historic Places in Greene County, New York